Leucostethus fraterdanieli (common name: Santa Rita rocket frog) is a species of frog in the family Dendrobatidae. It is endemic to the Andes in Colombia (western slopes of the Cordillera Central and both slopes of the Cordillera Occidental). Colostethus yaguara might be its junior synonym.
It lives on the ground close to streams in cloud forests and in dry tropical forests. It is threatened by habitat loss caused by agriculture and logging.

References

fraterdanieli
Endemic fauna of Colombia
Amphibians of Colombia
Amphibians of the Andes
Amphibians described in 1971
Taxonomy articles created by Polbot